"If We're Not Back in Love by Monday" is a song written by Sonny Throckmorton and Glenn Martin, and first recorded by American country music artist Merle Haggard.  It was released in March 1977 as the first single from the album Ramblin' Fever.  The song reached number 2 on the Billboard Hot Country Singles & Tracks chart.

Charts

Weekly charts

Year-end charts

Cover versions
Later in 1977, Millie Jackson recorded a cover version (with the slightly different title "If You're Not Back In Love By Monday")  for her album Feelin' Bitchy, which was released as a single and hit the Billboard Pop (#43) and R&B charts (#5).
In 1978, the song was also recorded by Throckmorton on his debut album, Last Cheater's Waltz.

References

1977 singles
Merle Haggard songs
Millie Jackson songs
Sonny Throckmorton songs
Songs written by Sonny Throckmorton
Song recordings produced by Ken Nelson (American record producer)
MCA Records singles
1977 songs